Reign Over Me is a 2007 American buddy drama film written and directed by Mike Binder, and produced by his brother Jack Binder. The film follows the story of former college roommates and old friends Alan and Charlie, the latter of whom is struggling with mental health issues after the loss of his wife and daughters in the September 11 Attacks. Reign Over Me stars Adam Sandler and Don Cheadle with Jada Pinkett Smith, Liv Tyler, Donald Sutherland, Saffron Burrows, Mike Binder and Melinda Dillon (in her final film acting role before retiring from acting and her death in 2023) in supporting roles.

Distributed by Columbia Pictures, the film was theatrically released on March 23, 2007, and on DVD and Blu-ray on October 9, 2007.

Plot 
After the Twin Towers went down in 2001, Charlie Fineman lost everything important in his life. Five years have passed since Charlie's wife and daughters died, and now the once-successful and sociable man has become a withdrawn shadow of his former self. He does not discuss his loss, causing his in-laws to worry for his sanity, believing that he has struck the tragedy from his mind.

When fate brings Charlie and his former college roommate Alan Johnson together once again on a Manhattan street corner, Alan is shocked to see just how far his old friend has fallen. Charlie's hair is long and he wears a headset constantly to let music drown out any mentions of his wife and children.

Though on the surface it would appear that Alan, a successful dentist, has it all, the pressures of a family and career have been weighing heavily on him. At a pivotal moment when Charlie and Alan both need a trusted friend, the restorative power of a rekindled friendship provides a lifeline needed to move forward.

Alan endeavors to bring Charlie out of his shell by convincing him to see a therapist. Barely communicative, he ends every session after only a couple of minutes. His therapist says he needs to tell the story about his family to someone eventually and Charlie soon tells Alan his tragic story. Later on, following a suicide by cop attempt, Charlie ends up in a psychiatric ward.

Legal proceedings commence, and Judge David Raines must determine whether to commit Charlie to psychiatric care. After Charlie suffers a breakdown, Raines leaves the decision to Charlie's in-laws, asking them to think of what their daughter would want for him. Charlie approaches his in-laws in the lobby of the courthouse, stating that he does not carry pictures nor discuss his family because he sees them every day, in the faces of people walking down the street. They decide that he should not be committed; instead, Charlie moves to a new apartment, leaving behind the painful memories associated with his former home.

Alan visits Charlie in his new home and his wife calls and tells him "I love you and just want you to come home." The apartment's doorman brings out Charlie's scooter, telling Alan not to leave stuff lying around. He tells the doorman to take it back upstairs, but he does not respond. Not knowing what to do, Alan decides to ride home on the scooter.

Cast 
 Adam Sandler as Dr. Charlie Fineman
 Don Cheadle as Dr. Alan Johnson
 Jada Pinkett Smith as Janeane Johnson
 Liv Tyler as Dr. Angela Oakhurst, Charlie's therapist
 Saffron Burrows as Donna Remar, Alan's "stalker" patient
 Donald Sutherland as committal hearing Judge David Raines
 Robert Klein as Jonathan Timpleman, Charlie's father in-law
 Melinda Dillon as Ginger Timpleman, Charlie's mother in-law
 Mike Binder (film's director) as Bryan Sugarman, Charlie's protective pre-tragedy best friend
 Jonathan Banks as Stelter, Alan's abrasive dental practice partner
 John de Lancie as Nigel Pennington, a "covert" therapist Alan arranges
 Rae Allen as Adell Modell, Charlie's protective landlady
 Paula Newsome as Melanie, Alan's protective dental practice receptionist
 Ted Raimi as Peter Saravino, Charlie's committal hearing lawyer
 B. J. Novak as Fallon, the DA's committal hearing lawyer

Soundtrack 

The many songs during the film include Bruce Springsteen's "Out in the Street" and "Drive All Night", "Simple Man" by Graham Nash, and a few songs by the Who, including the titular "Love, Reign o'er Me". The latter appears on the film's soundtrack, along with a cover version recorded specifically for the film by Pearl Jam. 

Televised trailers featured the songs "Ashes" by English band Embrace, "All These Things That I've Done" by the Killers, "How to Save a Life" by the Fray, and "In This Life" by Chantal Kreviazuk. 

The score was written by Rolfe Kent and orchestrated by Tony Blondal.

Reception

Box office 

The film opened to $7,460,690 from 1,671 theaters, for an average of $4,465 per venue. Its last recorded weekend was April 27–29, 2007, with a final domestic gross of $19,661,987. It made another $2,560,321 internationally, for a total worldwide gross of $22,222,308, against its $20 million budget.

Critical response 

On Rotten Tomatoes, the film has an approval rating of 64% based on 153 reviews, with an average rating of 6.3/10. The site's critical consensus reads, "Reign Over Me is a charming, affecting tale of friendship and loss, with solid performances from Adam Sandler as a broken, grief-stricken man and Don Cheadle as his old friend and savior." On Metacritic, the film has a weighted average score of 61 out of 100, based on 33 critics, indicating "generally favorable reviews." Audiences surveyed by CinemaScore gave the film a grade A− on scale of A to F.

Lisa Schwarzbaum at Entertainment Weekly gave Reign Over Me a B− rating, calling the film "a strange, black-and-blue therapeutic drama equally mottled with likable good intentions and agitating clumsiness." She shared her own discomfort with seeing the September 11 attacks casually included as a plot device in a fictional dramedy, though praised the film's performances and story. The New York Times found the film "maddeningly uneven", adding, "It's rare to see so many moments of grace followed by so many stumbles and fumbles, or to see intelligence and discretion undone so thoroughly by glibness and grossness. And it is puzzling, and ultimately draining, to see a film that waves the flag of honesty—Face your demons! Speak from your heart! Open up!—turn out to be so phony."

The video gaming blog Kotaku praised Reign Over Me's inclusion of the video game Shadow of the Colossus, stating that it "must be one of the first Hollywood films, if not the first, to deal with games thematically and intelligently."

See also 
 List of cultural references to the September 11 attacks

References

External links 
 
 
 
 

2007 films
2007 drama films
American buddy drama films
2000s buddy drama films
Films based on the September 11 attacks
Films set in New York City
Columbia Pictures films
Happy Madison Productions films
Relativity Media films
Films directed by Mike Binder
Sunlight Productions films
Films scored by Rolfe Kent
2000s English-language films
Films about grieving
2000s American films